ʻAbd al-Ḥalīm (ALA-LC romanization of ) is a male Muslim given name, and in modern usage, surname. It is built from the Arabic words ʻabd and al-Ḥalīm, one of the names of God in the Qur'an, which gives rise to the Muslim theophoric names. It means "servant of the all-clement".

It may refer to:

Mononym
 Abdul Halim of Kedah (1927-2017), Yang di-Pertuan Agong of Malaysia
 Abdul Hamid Halim of Kedah (1864–1943), 26th Sultan of Kedah
 Abdul Halim (Indonesia) (1911 - 1988), 4th Prime Minister of Indonesia
 Abdul Halim Bukhari (1945–2022), Bangladeshi Islamic scholar
 Abdul Halim (cricketer) (born 1998), Bangladeshi cricketer

Given name

Abdel Halim
 Abdel Halim Ali (born 1973), Egyptian footballer
 Abdel Halim Hafez (1929 - 1977), Egyptian singer and actor
 Abdel Halim Muhammad (1910–2009), Sudanese doctor and administrator

Abdel-Halim
 Abdel-Halim Caracalla (born 1940), Lebanese dance company director
 Abdel-Halim Mahmoud (1910 - 1978), Egyptian Grand Imam of Al Azhar
 Abdel-Halim Nowera (died 1985), Egyptian conductor and impresario

Abdelhalim
 Abdelhalim El-Kholti, known as Abdou El-Kholti (born 1980), Moroccan-French footballer
 Abdelhalim Ouradi (born 1981), Algerian boxer

Abdul Halim
 Abdul Halim Bukhari, Bangladeshi Islamic Scholar
 Abdul Halim Abdul Rahman, Malaysian politician
 Abdul Halim Abdul Samad, Malaysian politician, senator and businessman
 Abdul Halim Chowdhury, Bangladeshi politician
 Abdul Halim Ghaznavi (1876-1953), Bengali Muslim League politician 
 Abdul Halim Haron, Singaporean bodybuilder
 Abdul Halim Khaddam (1932–2020), Syrian politician
 Abdul Halim Khan, Pakistani politician, Muslim cleric
 Abdul Halim Jaffer Khan (1929–2017), Indian sitar player
Mirza Abdul Halim Mirza Abdul Majid (1966-1989), Singaporean police officer 
 Abdul Halim Majalengka (1887-1962), Indonesian Islamic scholar and nationalist
 Abdul Halim Moussa (c. 1930–2003), Egyptian police major general and interior minister
 Abdul Halim Sadiqi (born ca. 1968), Pakistani prisoner in Guantanamo
 Abdul Halim Saari (born 1994), Malaysian footballer
 Abdul Halim Sharar (1869 - 1926), Indian essayist and historian
 Abdul Halim Tokmakçioğlu (born 1913), Turkish Olympic fencer
 Abdul Halim Zainal (born 1988), Malaysian footballer

Abdul-Halim
 Abdul-Halim Sadulayev (1966 – 2006), President of the Chechen Republic of Ichkeria

Abd al-Halim
 Abd al-Halim Abu Ghazala (1930 - 2008), Egyptian soldier and politician

Abdul Haleem
 Abdul Haleem Chaudhri (died 1971), Bengali cricketer

Surname

Abdel Halim
 Moustafa Ali Abdel Halim (born 1943), Egyptian weightlifter

Abdel-Halim
 Ahmad Abdel-Halim (born 1986), Jordanian footballer of Palestinian origin
 Aziza Abdel-Halim, President of the Muslim Women's National Network Australia

Abdel-Haleem
 Muhammad Abdel-Haleem, Egyptian academic working in London

Abdelhaleem
 Shareef Abdelhaleem (born ca. 1979), Egyptian-Canadian accused of terrorism
 Abdelmahmood Abdelhaleem, Sudanese diplomat

Abdul Halim
 Ahmad Fairuz Abdul Halim (born 1941), Chief Justice of the Federal Court of Malaysia
 Badrulzaman Abdul Halim (born 1978), Malaysian footballer
 Edry, Norman and Yusry Abdul Halim, three brothers and members of Malaysian pop boy band KRU 
 Hashim Abdul Halim (1935–2015), Indian politician
 M. H. A. Haleem (born 1956), Sri Lankan politician
 Nik Shahrul Azim Abdul Halim (born 1990), Malaysian footballer

Abdul-Haleem
 Ahmed Abdul-Haleem (born 1986), Jordanian footballer

Other uses
 Sultan Abdul Halim Airport, Kedah, Malaysia
 Sultan Abdul Halim Highway, Kedah, Malaysia
 Sultan Abdul Halim Hospital, Kedah, Malaysia
 Sultan Abdul Halim Mu'adzam Shah Gallery, Kedah, Malaysia
 Sultan Abdul Halim Muadzam Shah Bridge, Penang, Malaysia
 SM Sultan Abdul Halim, school near Kedah, Malaysia
 Sultan Abdul Halim ferry terminal bridge collapse, 1988 disaster in Malaysia

See also
Halim (name)

References

Arabic masculine given names
Turkish masculine given names